The Greybull Main Post Office in Greybull, Wyoming was built in 1937 as part of a facilities improvement program by the United States Post Office Department.  The post office in Greybull was nominated to the National Register of Historic Places as part of a thematic study comprising twelve Wyoming post offices built to standardized USPO plans in the early twentieth century.

References

External links
 at the National Park Service's NRHP database
Greybull Main Post Office at Wyoming State Historic Preservation Office

Government buildings completed in 1937
Buildings and structures in Big Horn County, Wyoming
Greybull
Post office buildings on the National Register of Historic Places in Wyoming
National Register of Historic Places in Big Horn County, Wyoming